Rhynchosporium secalis is an ascomycete fungus that is the causal agent of barley and rye scald.

Morphology 
No sexual stage is known.  The mycelium is hyaline to light gray and develops sparsely as a compact stroma under the cuticle of the host plant.  Condia (2-4 x 12-20 μm) are borne sessilely on cells of the fertile stroma.  They are hyaline, 1-septate, and cylindric to ovate, mostly with a short apical beak. Microconida have been reported, but their function is unknown.  They are exuded from flasklike mycelial branches.

Host species
Agropyron dasystachyum, A. desertorum, A. elmeri, A. intermedium, A. riparium, A. scabriglume, A. semicostatum, A. subsecundum, A. trachycaulum, A. trachycaulum var. trachycaulum, A. trachycaulum var. unilaterale
Agrostis gigantea, A. stolonifera, A. tenuis 
Alopecurus geniculatus, A. pratensis
Bouteloua gracilis, B. hirsuta
Bromus aleutensis, B. carinatus, B. ciliatus, B. frondosus, B. inermis, B. pumpellianus, B. secalinus, B. vulgaris
Calamagrostis arundinacea, C. epigejos
Chrysopogon gryllus
Critesion murinum
Cynodon dactylon
Dactylis glomerata
Danthonia sp.
Deschampsia cespitosa
Elymus angustus, E. canadensis, E. chinensis, E. glaucus, E. junceus, E. repens, E. virginicus
Festuca pratensis, F. rubra
Hordeum aegiceras, H. brachyantherum, H. distichon, H. hexastichon, H. jubatum, H. leporinum, H. murinum, H. vulgare, H. vulgare var. nudum, [[Hordeum vulgare var. trifurcatum|H. vulgare var. trifurcatum]]
Leymus condensatus, L. innovatus, L. triticoides
Lolium multiflorum, L. perenne, L. rigidum
Microlaena stipoides
Panicum sp.
Phalaris arundinacea
Phleum pratense
Poa annua, P. eminens, P. pratensis
Quercus chrysolepis
Roegneria sp.
Secale cereale, S. montanum
× Triticosecale sp.

Sources 
 Index Fungorum
 USDA ARS Fungal Database

References 

Fungal plant pathogens and diseases
Rye diseases
Barley diseases
Ascomycota enigmatic taxa